Coleophora gossypinae is a moth of the family Coleophoridae.

The larvae feed on Caroxylon gossipinum. They feed on the generative organs of their host plant.

References

gossypinae
Moths described in 1989